Sok is a surname. Notable people with the surname include:
Sok An (1950–2017), Cambodian academic and politician
Sok Chanphal (born 1984), Cambodian songwriter
Sok Chanraksmey (1992), former Cambodian footballer 
Ho Sok Fong (1970), Chinese Malaysian writer
Hong Sok-jung (1941), North Korean writer
Jean Sok, French-born one-legged professional breakdancer
Kang Pan-sok (1892–1932), Korean independence activist
Khin Sok (1942–2011), Cambodian historian, linguist, literature and arts scholar
Sok Kong (1948), Khmer businessman and founder of Sokimex
Sok Rithy (born 1990), former Cambodian footballer
Sok Samnang (1995), Cambodian footballer
Sok San, Cambodian politician
Sok Siphana (1960), Cambodian lawyer
Sok Sovan (1992), former Cambodian footballer
Sok Sreymom, Cambodian film star
Sok Touch, Cambodian intellectual
Yang Sok-il (1936), Korean writer
Yu Jae Sok (born 1972), South Korean comedian, host and television personality

Surnames of Cambodian origin
Korean-language surnames
Khmer-language surnames
Surnames of Korean origin